Byculla Assembly constituency is one of the 288 Vidhan Sabha (legislative assembly) constituencies of Maharashtra state in western India.

Overview
Byculla (constituency number 184) is one of the ten Vidhan Sabha constituencies located in the Mumbai City district. Number of electorates in 2009 was 271,507 (male 153,641, female 117,866).

Byculla is part of the Mumbai South Lok Sabha constituency along with five other Vidhan Sabha segments in Mumbai City district, namely Worli, Shivadi, Colaba, Malabar Hill and Mumbadevi.

Members of Legislative Assembly

Election results

2019 result

2014 result

2009 result

See also
 Byculla
 List of constituencies of Maharashtra Vidhan Sabha

References

Assembly constituencies of Mumbai
Mumbai City district
Assembly constituencies of Maharashtra